Hom is a surname in various cultures. Its languages of origin include Danish, Dutch, English, and Taishanese.

Origins
Hom may be:
An English surname, a variant of Home, Homme, or Holme.
A Chinese surname, spelled in Mandarin Pinyin as Tán. The spelling Hom is based on the Taishanese pronunciation. That surname originated as a topoynmic surname referring to the ancient state of Tan.
A Danish surname of unexplained origin.
A Dutch surname of unexplained origin.

Statistics
In the Netherlands, there were 166 people with the surname Hom as of 2007, up from 124 in 1947.

As of 2018, 29 people in Denmark bore the surname Høm, and two the surname Hom.

According to statistics cited by Patrick Hanks, 17 people on the island of Great Britain and none on the island of Ireland bore the surname Hom in 2011. In 1881 there were four people with the surname in Great Britain.

The 2010 United States Census found 4,863 people with the surname Hom, making it the 6,906th-most-common name in the country. This represented an decrease from 5,015 (6,262nd-most-common) in the 2000 Census. In both censuses, about four-fifths of the bearers of the surname identified as Asian, and one-tenth as White. It was the 269th-most-common surname among respondents to the 2000 Census who identified as Asian.

People
People with the surname Hom or Høm include:
Paul Høm (1905–1994), Danish painter and stained glass artist
Tom Hom (born 1927), American politician
Jesper Høm (1931–2000), Danish photographer and film director
Tonnie Hom (1932–2013), Dutch swimmer
Ken Hom (born 1949), American chef
Sharon Hom (born 1951), Hong Kong-born American human rights law professor
Alice Y. Hom (born 1967), American LGBTQ community activist
Marc Hom (born 1967), Danish fashion photographer

See also
Pol Hom (born 1946), Cambodian politician (Hom is his given name)
Shuvagata Hom (born 1986), Bangladeshi cricketer (his surname is Chowdury)

References

Chinese-language surnames
Taishanese-language surnames
Danish-language surnames
Dutch-language surnames
English-language surnames